Arsenic is the chemical element with symbol As and atomic number 33.

Arsenic may also refer to:

 Arsenic trioxide, a poison commonly referred to as simply as "arsenic"
 Arsenic acid, a chemical compound with the formula H3AsO4
 Arsenic Lake, a lake in Ontario, Canada
 Ärsenik, a French rap group
 Mr. Arsenic, an America anthology television series

See also
 Arsenic and Old Lace (disambiguation)
 :Category:Arsenic compounds
 Isotopes of arsenic